Zhang Cheng may refer to:

 Zhang Cheng (Han dynasty) (張承; died  218), courtesy name Gongxian, an official of the late Eastern Han dynasty
 Zhang Cheng (Three Kingdoms) (張承; 178–244), courtesy name Zhongsi, a military general of Eastern Wu in the Three Kingdoms period
 Zhang Cheng (footballer) (张诚; born 1989), Chinese footballer